Lake Louise Airport  is a state-owned public-use airport located one nautical mile (2 km) northeast of the central business district of Lake Louise, in the Matanuska-Susitna Borough of the U.S. state of Alaska.

This airport is included in the FAA's National Plan of Integrated Airport Systems for 2011–2015 which categorized it as a general aviation facility.

Facilities 
Lake Louise Airport has one runway designated 12/30 with a gravel and turf surface measuring 700 by 18 feet (213 x 5 m).

References

External links 
 FAA Alaska airport diagram (GIF)
 Topographic map as of 1 July 1950 from USGS The National Map

Defunct airports in Alaska
Airports in Matanuska-Susitna Borough, Alaska